Retiready is a free digital retirement, saving and planning service provided by pension, insurance and investment company Aegon UK. It is designed to help people assess what their income needs will be in retirement and choose suitable products to achieve them.

History 

Aegon UK launched Retiready in April 2014. At the same time it published ‘The Aegon UK Readiness Report’  detailing how effectively people were saving for retirement.

The report found that only 7 percent of UK pension savers were close to saving enough to pay for the lifestyle they wanted in retirement. The research was conducted by speaking to over 4,000 people from across the UK.

The findings of the sixth Readiness Report  show, people are becoming increasingly aware of the need to pay attention to their retirement savings and overall engagement is improving at a promising pace.   Retiready calculates how effectively people are saving for their retirement by evaluating the lifestyle they want when they stop working, the existing savings arrangements they have in place and their future plans. It then gives users a score out of 100 to describe how on track they are to save the amount needed to generate the retirement lifestyle they want.

Services 

Retiready provides users with financial planning, forecasting and coaching tools. It enables users to analyse their existing pension and savings arrangements and to calculate the fees they are paying for these products.

Retiready also gives users access to new pensions and savings products.

References

External links 

Internet properties established in 2014
Retirement in the United Kingdom
2014 establishments in the United Kingdom